Scott Glenn May (born March 19, 1954) is an American former professional basketball player. As a college player at Indiana University, May led the Hoosiers to an undefeated record and national championship in the 1975–76 season. He was a two-time first-team All-American and was named the national player of the year in his senior season. May also won a gold medal at the 1976 Summer Olympics.

College career 
Born in Sandusky, Ohio, Scott May played as a 6'7" forward for Bob Knight and the Indiana University Hoosiers from 1972–1976. He began with a rocky start after being declared academically ineligible his freshman year. As a sophomore, he began to feel more confident in his studies, and the future championship nucleus of May, Kent Benson, Quinn Buckner and Bob Wilkerson started to gel. "Our group knew what we wanted. We were going to do whatever it took to win it all."

In his last two seasons with the school, 1974–75 and 1975–76, the Hoosiers were undefeated in the regular season and won 37-consecutive Big Ten games. The 1974–75 Hoosiers swept the entire Big Ten by an average of 22.8 points per game. However, in an 83-82 win against Purdue, May broke his left arm. With May's injury keeping him to 7 minutes of play, the No. 1 Hoosiers lost to Kentucky 92-90 in the Mideast Regional. The Hoosiers were so dominant that four starters – May, Steve Green, Kent Benson and Quinn Buckner – would make the five-man All-Big Ten team. The following season, 1975–76, the Hoosiers went the entire season and 1976 NCAA tournament without a single loss, beating Michigan 86–68 in the title game. Indiana remains the last school to accomplish this feat.

May was the 1975–76 team's leading scorer, "its most dependable clutch scorer, and an outstanding defensive player and rebounder, too." He was named NCAA men's basketball National Player of the Year in 1976. He won a gold medal as a member of the United States basketball team in the 1976 Summer Olympics. May graduated from Indiana in the standard four years with a degree in education.

Professional career 
The Chicago Bulls chose May with the second overall pick in the 1976 NBA draft. He made the NBA All-Rookie team after averaging 14.2 points for the Bulls. Injuries kept him to seven seasons in the NBA, scoring 3,690 points and pulling down 1,450 rebounds. He went on to play seven more years in Europe with Brescia, Torino, Rome and Livorno in the Italian league.

Personal life 
In the late 1970s, May's attorney Steve Ferguson, who had been recommended by Knight, suggested that May buy apartment units around the Indiana University campus. May invested in a couple of projects each off-season and now owns more than two thousand apartments in Bloomington. He is now known as one of  the biggest  apartment owners in the Bloomington area  employing several hundred employees. May had two sons – Scott May, Jr. and Sean May – who continued his tradition of basketball play. Scott Jr. played for the Indiana basketball team that made the NCAA title game in 2002. His younger son, Sean, helped North Carolina win a national championship in 2005 and played for the NBA Sacramento Kings and Charlotte Bobcats. May and Sean are one of four father-son duos to each win an NCAA basketball championship.

Career statistics

NBA

Regular season

|-
| align="left" | 1976–77
| align="left" | Chicago
| 72 || - || 32.9 || .451 || - || .828 || 6.1 || 2.0 || 1.1 || 0.2 || 14.6
|-
| align="left" | 1977–78
| align="left" | Chicago
| 55 || - || 32.8 || .454 || - || .810 || 6.0 || 2.1 || 0.9 || 0.1 || 13.4
|-
| align="left" | 1978–79
| align="left" | Chicago
| 37 || - || 10.9 || .434 || - || .750 || 1.7 || 1.1 || 0.6 || 0.0 || 4.0
|-
| align="left" | 1979–80
| align="left" | Chicago
| 54 || - || 24.0 || .450 || .000 || .837 || 4.0 || 1.9 || 0.8 || 0.1 || 12.4
|-
| align="left" | 1980–81
| align="left" | Chicago
| 63 || - || 12.9 || .488 || .000 || .758 || 2.5 || 1.0 || 0.6 || 0.1 || 7.0
|-
| align="left" | 1981–82
| align="left" | Milwaukee
| 65 || 7 || 18.3 || .508 || .000 || .824 || 3.4 || 2.0 || 0.8 || 0.1 || 9.0
|-
| align="left" | 1982–83
| align="left" | Detroit
| 9 || 1 || 17.2 || .420 || .000 || .810 || 2.9 || 1.3 || 0.6 || 0.2 || 6.6
|- class="sortbottom"
| style="text-align:center;" colspan="2"| Career
| 355 || 8 || 22.6 || .462 || .000 || .811 || 4.1 || 1.7 || 0.8 || 0.1 || 10.4
|}

Playoffs

|-
| align="left" | 1976–77
| align="left" | Chicago
| 3 || - || 32.3 || .385 || - || .800 || 4.7 || 1.0 || 2.7 || 0.7 || 10.7
|-
| align="left" | 1981–82
| align="left" | Milwaukee
| 4 || - || 12.5 || .200 || .000 || .643 || 2.8 || 2.5 || 0.5 || 0.0 || 4.3
|- class="sortbottom"
| style="text-align:center;" colspan="2"| Career
| 7 || - || 21.0 || .304 || .000 || .724 || 3.6 || 1.9 || 1.4 || 0.3 || 7.0
|}

College

|-
| align="left" | 1973–74
| align="left" | Indiana
| 28 || - || - || .492 || - || .768 || 5.4 || 1.5 || - || - || 12.5
|-
| align="left" | 1974–75
| align="left" | Indiana
| 30 || - || - || .510 || - || .766 || 6.6 || 1.9 || - || - || 16.3
|-
| align="left" | 1975–76
| align="left" | Indiana
| 32 || - || - || .527 || - || .782 || 7.7 || 2.1 || - || - || 23.5
|- class="sortbottom"
| style="text-align:center;" colspan="2"| Career
| 90 || - || - || .513 || - || .774 || 6.6 || 1.8 || - || - || 17.7
|}

Notes

References

NCAA, NCAA March Madness: Cinderellas, Superstars, and Champions from the NCAA men's Final Four : Chicago: Triumph Books, 2004.

External links and sources
Scott May statistics
Scott May Serie A statistics.

1954 births
Living people
20th-century African-American sportspeople
21st-century African-American people
African-American basketball players
All-American college men's basketball players
American men's basketball players
Auxilium Pallacanestro Torino players
Basket Brescia Leonessa players
Basketball players at the 1976 Summer Olympics
Basketball players from Ohio
Chicago Bulls draft picks
Chicago Bulls players
Detroit Pistons players
Indiana Hoosiers men's basketball players
Libertas Liburnia Basket Livorno players
Medalists at the 1976 Summer Olympics
Milwaukee Bucks players
Olympic gold medalists for the United States in basketball
Pallacanestro Virtus Roma players
Power forwards (basketball)
Sportspeople from Sandusky, Ohio